Rudolph E. "Rudy" Lapick (17 November 1926 – 27 February 2004) was an American comic book artist who worked as an inker for Archie Comics for many years. He was nominated for a Shazam Award in 1974 for Best Inker (humor).

Biography
Rudy Lapick was born in The Bronx, New York City, New York, the son of Rudolph and Florence Lapick. He had a brother, John, and a sister, Gioia. After he married Mary Zema on May 30, 1948, the couple moved to nearby Yonkers, New York. They had a daughter, Lorraine and two sons, Rudy Jr. and John.

Lapick became a staff inker at Timely Comics, the 1940s forerunner of Marvel Comics. In the 1950s, his work included issues of G.I. Joe for Ziff-Davis Comics. He was Dan DeCarlo's primary inker for the majority of DeCarlo's career both at Timely and for  decades at Archie.

Lapick maintained a long friendship with fellow Timely/Atlas artist Gene Colan, dating to their working together in the Timely art room starting in 1946. Almost five decades later, he inked some of Colan's late-career work at Archie Comics.

He was living in Yonkers at the time of his death.

References

Further reading
 Interview (April 2003) Alter Ego (3) 11

External links

1926 births
2004 deaths
American comics artists
Comics inkers
Artists from the Bronx